The Law Council of Wales is an organisation in Wales which promotes legal education, awareness of Welsh law, provision of teaching the law in Welsh and to assist students in law training.

History 
The Law Council of Wales was established for the purpose of promoting legal education, training and awareness in Welsh law. The council also supports economic development and sustainability of law in Wales.

Thomas Commission 
The Law Council of Wales was established following recommendations by the independent Commission of Justice in Wales in 2019 which set out the vision of the legal system in Wales. The commission was chaired by Lord Thomas of Cwmgiedd, former Lord Chief Justice of England and Wales.

Committee members 

 Lord Lloyd-Jones, UK Supreme Court (President of the Law Council of Wales)
 Professor Emyr Lewis, Aberystwyth University
 Alison Perry, Swansea University
 Dr Hephzibah Egede, Cardiff Metropolitan University
 Mark Davies, Goldstones Solicitors & Chair of The Law Society Wales Committee
 Dr Nerys Llewelyn-Jones, Agri Advisor
 David Elias QC, 9 Park Place Chambers
 Jonathan Elystan Rees QC, Apex Chambers
 In-house representative with one place shared on alternating basis: Dan Caunt, Admiral Group PLC, and Daniela Mahapatra, NWSSP Legal & Risk Services
 Sir Wyn Williams, President of Welsh Tribunals
 Presiding Judge for Wales representative shared alternatively between Mr Justice Simon Picken and Mrs Justice Nerys Jefford
 Jenny Hopkins, Crown Prosecution Service
 Lord Justice Green, Law Commission
 Mr Justice Martin Griffiths, Judicial College
 Fran Targett, National Advice Network for Wales

References 

Welsh law